Estadio Belvedere is a multi-use stadium in Montevideo, Uruguay.  It is currently used primarily for football matches.  The stadium holds 10,000 people and was built in 1909. On August 15, 1910, in a game at Estadio Belvedere, the Uruguay national football team wore their signature light blue jerseys for the first time.  The game ended in a 3–1 victory over Argentina.  It was also the first game that Argentina wore their signature blue and white striped jerseys. The Estadio, formerly owned by the Montevideo Wanderers, now belongs to Liverpool FC of Montevideo.

References

External links
 Estadio Belvedere

Belvedere
Belvedere
B
Liverpool F.C. (Montevideo)
Belvedere, Montevideo